Ali Hussein Rehema Al-Mutairi (born on 8 August 1985) is an Iraqi former footballer. He has represented the Iraq national football team.

Career 

Since playing every minute of Iraq's title-winning campaign at the 2007 AFC Asian Cup, Ali Rehema has established his status as one of the team's defensive stalwarts. He held on to his regular place during Iraq's failed 2010 FIFA World Cup South Africa qualifying bid, starting seven of the team's eight games. After playing for Al Talaba, Al Quwa Al Jawiya and Arbil FC, Rehema earned his first international move when he was signed by Libyan giants Al-Ahly in 2007. After spending a season with the Tripoli-based club, he was attracted to Qatari outfits Al Wakra, where he continues to play.

Aside from shoring up the Iraqi defence, Rehema can also play the role as the defensive midfielder in their 4-5-1 formation, protecting the back four while launching counter-attacks from deep.

Rehema announced his retirement from international football, citing his reason to allow younger players the opportunity to represent the Iraqi national team.

International goals
Scores and results list Iraq's goal tally first..

Honours

Club 

Iraqi Premier League
 2004-2005 with Al-Quwa Al-Jawiya
 2006-2007 with Erbil SC
 2017-2018 with Al-Zawraa
Iraq FA Cup
 2003 with Talaba SC
Iraqi Super Cup
 2002 with Talaba SC
 2017 with Al-Zawraa

Country 
Iraq National football team
 2005 West Asian Games Gold medallist.
 2006 Asian Games Silver medallist.
 2007 Asian Cup: winner
 21st Arabian Gulf Cup: runner-up

Individual 
 Soccer Iraq Team of the Decade: 2010–2019

See also
 List of men's footballers with 100 or more international caps

References

External links 
 Player profile - doha-2006.com
 

Iraqi expatriate footballers
1985 births
Living people
Iraqi footballers
Iraq international footballers
2007 AFC Asian Cup players
2009 FIFA Confederations Cup players
2011 AFC Asian Cup players
AFC Asian Cup-winning players
Al-Wakrah SC players
Expatriate footballers in Qatar
Iraqi expatriate sportspeople in Qatar
Sportspeople from Baghdad
Association football central defenders
Association football midfielders
Asian Games medalists in football
Footballers at the 2006 Asian Games
FIFA Century Club
Qatar Stars League players
Asian Games silver medalists for Iraq
Medalists at the 2006 Asian Games